MOCCA or MoCCA may refer to:
 MoCCA Festival, comics showcase
 Museum of Contemporary Canadian Art, Toronto
 Museum of Comic and Cartoon Art, New York

Mocca may refer to:
 Mocca (band), a jazz and swing band from Indonesia
 Mocca.com, advertiser in Singapore
 "Mocca", a song by Colombian singer Lalo Ebratt
 Mocca Bone, Colombian-Belgian drag queen

See also 
 MOCA (disambiguation)
 Moccas, village in Herefordshire
 Mocha (disambiguation)